Yunus is a surname, with the same origin and meaning as Yunus (given name). 

Like the given name, there are several variant spellings.

Notable people with this surname
 Adel Younis (died 1976), Egyptian jurist and politician
 Amin Younes (born 1993), German footballer
 Abdul Fatah Younis (1944–2011), senior military officer in Libya who defected to join the rebels of the 2011 Libyan civil war
 Glenn Younes, sports radio talk show host and update anchor
 Imed Ben Younes (born 1974), Tunisian footballer
 Hadrat Yunus, the Prophet Jonah as mentioned in the Qur'an
 Ibn Yunus, 10th-century Egyptian mathematician and astronomer
 Fawaz Younis, Lebanese hijacker
 Leyla Yunus, Azerbaijani human rights activist
 Lincoln Younes (born 1992), Australian actor
 Megat Yunus, Malaysian politician
 Mohammad Yunus, Indian diplomat
 Mohammad Yunus, Indian politician
 Mohammad Yunus Khalis, mujahideen commander of Afghanistan
 Monica Yunus, opera singer
 Muhammad Yunus, Bangladeshi banker, economist, and Nobel Peace Prize recipient
 Nadia Younes (1946–2003), Egyptian UN and WHO official
 Samora Mohammad Yunis, Chief of Staff of the Ethiopian Army
 Waqar Younis, Pakistani cricketer